Blaenycoed, or Blaen-y-coed is a village situated between Carmarthen and Newcastle Emlyn, Wales, of 17 houses, a Welsh Independents chapel, a postbox and small farms. Blaen-y-coed literally translates to mean "Head-of-the-wood.". Woodland Rise is a camping and caravanning site in the village.

Notable people
Howell Elvet Lewis, the Independent minister, hymn-writer, poet, known as Elfed, was born in 1860. The house where he was born, Y Gangell, is near Blaenycoed and contains a small exhibition of his life. His ashes were also scattered in Blaenycoed chapel graveyard.

References

Villages in Carmarthenshire